Henri Zambelli (born 9 March 1957 in Marseille) is a French retired professional football defender.

External links
Profile

1957 births
Footballers from Marseille
Living people
French footballers
Association football defenders
OGC Nice players
Olympique de Marseille players
Olympique Lyonnais players
Stade Brestois 29 players
Stade Rennais F.C. players
Ligue 1 players
Ligue 2 players
Olympic footballers of France
Footballers at the 1976 Summer Olympics